James Kirby Martin (born May 26, 1943) is Hugh Roy and Lillie Cranz Cullen University Professor of History at the University of Houston, Houston, Texas. A nationally recognized scholar in United States history, he is well known for his writings on various aspects of American military and social history, specifically the American Revolution, and the study of alcohol-related issues  in the United States. In addition to his scholarly work and publications, Martin has advised and appeared on television programs aired on the History Channel and also advises New York-based Talon Films on historical issues.  Recently he has become involved in movie production.

Education, background, and achievements 
Martin received his B.A. from Hiram College (summa cum laude) and then earned his M.A. and Ph.D. from the University of Wisconsin. He began his teaching career at Rutgers University, where he earned the rank of Professor of History and also served for a period as Vice President for Academic Affairs. In 1980, Martin moved to the University of Houston, having accepted assignment as the Department Chair of History.
Martin helped to found the Papers of Thomas Edison project at Rutgers University and for a few years served on its board of advisers. He was also on the advisory board of the Papers of William Livingston project. Martin has served as general editor for a book series, the American Social Experience (New York University Press), and as a consulting editor for a book series entitled Conversations with the Past (Brandywine Press). Martin is currently serving on the advisory board of editors for the Critical Historical Encounters book series sponsored by Oxford University Press.

Martin has consulted with some of the nation's most eminent law firms with regard to the history of various consumer products, including alcohol and tobacco, and has collaborated and appeared on programs aired by the History Channel. Talon Films of New York also regularly consults with Martin on historical matters. Martin has worked on two current movie screenplays: one focusing on Benedict Arnold’s treason and the other on Oneida warrior Han Yerry Doxtader and Mohawk warrior Joseph Brant.

Teaching inventory 
Martin's teaching interests include early American history through the Revolution, American military history through the Civil War, and the history of medicine and health in the United States, particularly that of drinking, smoking, and drug usage. He teaches or has taught many undergraduate courses at the University of Houston, including a survey history of the United States; topical courses in colonial and Revolutionary American history; and capstone courses on such subjects as disease and addiction in the American experience. At the graduate level, Martin has offered a variety of courses, including early American historiography as well as introductory and advanced courses on research and writing in United States history.

Research interests 
Martin is the award-winning author and editor of twelve books and numerous scholarly articles. His current research interests focus on military, social, and political aspects of early American history, especially the Revolutionary era and beyond.

Martin recently completed a major revision of his co-authored work, A Respectable Army: The Military Origins of the Republic, 1763-1789 (2006), and he has co-authored (with Joseph Glatthaar) Forgotten Allies: The Oneida Indians and the American Revolution (2006). In 2008, a new third edition of Ordinary Courage: The Revolutionary War Adventures of Joseph Plumb Martin, also appeared.

Martin's current writing projects includes The Remarkable Revolution: How the United States Avoided Becoming a Military Dictatorship, 1775-1787 (tentative title, with Oxford University Press), as well as a volume on Han Yerry Doxtader and the Iroquois Indians titled American Warrior: Han Yerry Doxtader, the Battle of Oriskany, and the Decline and Fall of the Six Nations of Iroquois Indians. Two other projects under way include an investigation of Benedict Arnold's treason (with Oxford University Press), and a study of the history of smoking in America (a companion volume related to his earlier co-authored book on drinking in America).

Works 

 

 
 (on Bloomfield, Joseph, 1753-1823)

 
 
 
 
 
, on Martin, Joseph Plumb, 1760-1850.
, on Martin, Joseph Plumb, 1760-1850.

References

External links 
Faculty listing at University of Houston: James Kirby Martin | Department of History

Living people
1943 births
21st-century American historians
21st-century American male writers
Historians of the United States
University of Houston faculty
University of Wisconsin–Madison alumni
Writers from Texas
Writers from Wisconsin
American male non-fiction writers